Swaroop Philip is an Indian cinematographer best known for his work in Malayalam cinema.

Swaroop made his debut with Orkut Oru Ormakoot (2012). His well-known films include You Too Brutus (film) (2015). Swaroop cracked the camera for the promo music video Sirikkadhey for the Tamil movie Remo (film).his work in the video which stars composer Anirudh Ravichander along with  singers Arjun Kanungo & Srinidhi Venkatesh and actors Sivakarthikeyan and Keerthi Suresh. In 2018 he rolled camera for Malayalam movies Aravindante Athidhikal and Premasoothram.

Career
Swaroop was active in the advertisement industry.

Personal life
Swaroop married Divya George on January 7, 2014.

Filmography

As Cinematographer 

| 2022 ||  Sundari Gardens  ||
[[Malayalam 
language|Malayalam]] ||

References

Malayalam film cinematographers
Cinematographers from Kerala
Indian Christians
People from Changanassery